TV XXI is a television channel broadcasting movies in Russian language and can be seen in Armenia, Azerbaijan, Belarus, Estonia, Georgia, Kazakhstan, Kyrgyzstan, Latvia, Lithuania, Moldova, Russia, Tajikistan, Ukraine and Uzbekistan.

References

External links
 

Television channels in Latvia
Companies based in Riga
Television channels and stations established in 1996
1996 establishments in Latvia
Russian-language television stations
Russian-language mass media in Latvia
Television in Azerbaijan
Television in Armenia
Television in Belarus
Television stations in Georgia (country)
Television in Kazakhstan
Television in Kyrgyzstan
Television channels in Lithuania
Television channels in Moldova
Television channels in Russia
Television in Tajikistan
Television in Uzbekistan
Television stations in Ukraine
Television channels in Estonia